Synopsia is a genus of moths in the family Geometridae erected by Jacob Hübner in 1825.

Species
Synopsia sociaria (Hübner, 1799)
Synopsia strictaria (Lederer, 1853)

References

Boarmiini